Dinami is a comune (municipality) in the Province of Vibo Valentia in the Italian region Calabria, located about  southwest of Catanzaro and about  southeast of Vibo Valentia.

The municipality of Dinami contains the frazioni (subdivisions, mainly villages and hamlets) Melicuccà  and Monsoreto.

Dinami borders the following municipalities: Acquaro, Dasà, Gerocarne, Mileto, San Pietro di Caridà, Serrata.

Demographic evolution

References

Cities and towns in Calabria